Meridiorhantus orbignyi is an extinct species of predaceous diving beetle in the family Dytiscidae. This species was formerly a member of the genus Rhantus.

References

Dytiscidae
Beetles described in 1992
Taxobox binomials not recognized by IUCN